Kiki Ceac, better known by his stage name K-the-I???, is an American rapper and producer based in Los Angeles, California and currently signed to Fake Four Inc.

History
K-the-I??? began recording in 2002. He released several small-issue records before signing with Mush Records in 2006. His debut for the label, Broken Love Letter, was primarily self-produced. The follow-up, Yesterday, Today & Tomorrow, was produced by Thavius Beck and arrived in 2008. The album was released on Big Dada in the UK. Yesterday, Today & Tomorrow featured several guest rappers, including Busdriver and Nocando.

Discography

Albums
 Teletron 1 (2003)
 Fair Weather Under the Surface Negative (2004)
 Broken Love Letter (2006)
 Yesterday, Today & Tomorrow (2008)
 Synthesthesia (2011)
 The Blueprint Of A Paper Airplane / Like Dust (Split with Walter Gross) (2013)

EPs
 Yung Planetz EP (2012) (with Bleubird & Sole, as Waco Boyz)

Guest appearances
 The Train Rawbers - "Astroturf" on The Train Rawbers (2004)
 Nephlim Modulation Systems - "Hold the Atmosphere" from Imperial Letters of Protection (2005)
 Scott Da Ros - "Ocean Splits in Half" "Silence + Circles" from One Kind of Dead End (2006)
 DJ Mayonnaise - "Strateegery" on Still Alive (2007)
 Noah23 - "Tragic Comedy" on Rock Paper Scissors (2008)
 Loden - "Radio" on "Self-Aware Wolf" b/w "Radio" (2010)
 Sole - "Hustle Hard" on Nuclear Winter Volume 2: Death Panel (2011)
 OptimisGFN - "Cambridge's Finest" on Young Whipper Snapper (2015)

References

External links
 K-the-I?? on Mush Records
 K-the-I??? on Fake Four Inc

African-American male rappers
Record producers from California
Living people
Rappers from Massachusetts
Rappers from Los Angeles
People from Cambridge, Massachusetts
West Coast hip hop musicians
21st-century American rappers
21st-century American male musicians
Year of birth missing (living people)
21st-century African-American musicians